Looking is an American comedy-drama television series which ran on HBO from January 19, 2014, to July 23, 2016. Created by Michael Lannan and produced by David Marshall Grant, Sarah Condon, and Andrew Haigh, it stars Jonathan Groff, Frankie J. Alvarez, Murray Bartlett, Lauren Weedman, Russell Tovey, and Raúl Castillo. The show follows the experiences of Patrick, Agustín, and Dom, three gay friends who live and work in modern-day San Francisco. It was the network's first series centered around the lives of gay men.

Looking was critically acclaimed for its writing, direction, the performances of the ensemble and its fresh take on an LGBT-centric narrative. With ten of the show's eighteen episodes directed by Andrew Haigh, the show's naturalistic shooting style drew comparisons to Haigh's 2011 film Weekend and to the mumblecore genre of independent film.

Despite its critical praise, its ratings never met network expectations, with just 298,000 viewers tuning in for its second-season finale. The low ratings led to the show's cancellation after its second season. HBO ordered a one-time television film, Looking: The Movie, to serve as the series' finale, which premiered at the Frameline Film Festival on June 26, 2016, and aired on July 23, 2016, in the U.S. on HBO and on August 2, 2016, in the UK on Sky Atlantic.

In 2019, The Guardian named Looking one of the "100 Greatest TV shows of the 21st century". In 2022, Esquire ranked Looking #21 on the list of "The Best HBO Series of All Time".

Premise
Patrick Murray, a 29-year-old video game designer, lives in San Francisco with his friends—aspiring restaurateur Dom and artist's assistant Agustín. Patrick has a tendency to be naïve and has been generally unlucky in love, but things in Patrick's life change upon meeting handsome yet humble Mission barber Richie and the arrival of his new boss, the attractive but partnered Kevin. Dom pursues his goal of opening his own restaurant with the support of his roommate, Doris, and the unexpected help of the successful and older San Francisco entrepreneur Lynn. Agustín struggles domesticating with his long-term boyfriend Frank and his stalling art career, as well as his penchant for recreational substance abuse.

The three men navigate life, relationships, family, and careers in modern-day San Francisco.

Cast and characters

Main
 Jonathan Groff as Patrick Murray, a 29-year-old video game designer who grew up in suburban Denver in a rather conservative family who initially had a hard time accepting his sexuality when he came out to them on Thanksgiving back in 2005 while in his second year of college. 
 Frankie J. Alvarez as Agustín Lanuez, 31, an artist's assistant and Patrick's best friend since their college days at The University of California, Berkeley. Agustín is from Coral Gables, Florida, outside Miami, and grew up in an affluent Cuban American household from which he is estranged due to the emotional and physical abuse he suffered at the hands of his alcoholic father as a child.
 Murray Bartlett as Dom Basaluzzo, 39, a sommelier in a gastronomic restaurant. Dom was raised by a single father who died when Dom was in his early twenties.
 Lauren Weedman as Doris (season 2, recurring season 1), Dom's best friend since their high school days in Modesto, who now works as a nurse; she and Dom dated during high school before he came out. Doris grew up with a father who was very loving as well as a mother who was emotionally abusive due to mental illness. 
 Russell Tovey as Kevin Matheson (season 2, recurring season 1), Patrick's boss, a "video-game wunderkind." Kevin has feelings for Patrick—though he is in a long-term relationship with Jon. In season two, Kevin becomes Patrick's new love interest.
 Raúl Castillo as Ricardo "Richie" Donado Ventura (season 2, recurring season 1), a barber and Patrick's part-time romantic interest. Richie grew up in a large working class Mexican-American family in San Leandro just outside of San Francisco and is currently estranged from his father due to his father's refusal to accept his sexuality.

Recurring
 Scott Bakula as Lynn, an entrepreneur who strikes a connection with Dom
 O. T. Fagbenle as Frank, Agustín's long-term boyfriend
 Andrew Law as Owen, Patrick's co-worker
 Ptolemy Slocum as Hugo (season 1), Dom's co-worker
 Joseph Williamson as Jon, Kevin's boyfriend
 Daniel Franzese as Eddie (season 2), Agustín's love interest who volunteers at a homeless shelter for LGBT youth
 Chris Perfetti as Brady (season 2), Richie's new boyfriend
 Bashir Salahuddin as Malik (season 2), Doris's love interest

Production
HBO ordered an eight-episode first season of Looking on May 14, 2013. The pilot was written by Michael Lannan, based on Lannan's 2011 short film entitled Lorimer, and directed by Andrew Haigh. Filming began in the San Francisco Bay Area on September 16, 2013, and ended on November 7, 2013. The first season premiered on January 19, 2014.

Creator Michael Lannan announced in an interview in February 2014 that the writers were already thinking of new material for a second season, should it come. His comment was quickly backed up by Nick Hall, director of comedy for HBO, who stated that the "initial one airing audience" isn't their main goal and that they [HBO] "look at it for the week, we look at it On Demand, we look at HBO Go," and that each of the episodes were doing "nicely".

On February 26, 2014, HBO announced that Looking was renewed for a second season. The second season premiered on January 11, 2015.

HBO cancelled the series after the second season citing the sharp decline in ratings. Afterwards, an online petition was started to continue the series. HBO eventually planned to air a movie to wrap up the storyline. Alvarez revealed in an interview with Vulture that filming was to start in September 2015 and that the length of the finale would be 2 hours. The movie premiered on June 2, 2016, at the Frameline Film Festival in San Francisco and aired on July 23, 2016.

Episodes

Reception

Critical response
Throughout its run Looking received acclaim from critics who hailed it as a fresh take on gay-themed drama and acclaimed the performances of its actors in particular of Groff and Tovey. Review aggregation website Rotten Tomatoes reports that 90% of critics gave the first season a positive review based on 37 reviews, with an average score of 7.6/10. The site's consensus states: "Funny without being obnoxious, Looking provides authentic situations that feel universal with its subtle details and top-notch performances." On the review aggregator website Metacritic, the first season holds an average of 73% based on 27 reviews, indicating generally favorable reviews. The second season received an aggregate score of 77% on Metacritic and 88% on Rotten Tomatoes.

Since Looking was announced it has been referred to by both the community and early critics as the "gay version" of Girls and Sex and the City. After watching the pilot, Emily St. James of The A.V. Club said that "differences between the two series go beyond the surface" and one of the show's lead actors, Jonathan Groff, went on to say that "to be in the same breath as those shows is exciting [...] but the tone and writing and the style of the show is very different. And people will notice that when they see it." Keith Uhlich, writing for the BBC, opined that Looking "is one of the most revolutionary depictions of gay life ever on TV – and that’s because it makes it totally ordinary."

The movie received generally positive reviews from critics. Rotten Tomatoes summarized the critical consensus as follows: "Touching and profound, Looking: The Movie puts a bittersweet conclusion to the too-soon-gone HBO series with humor and hopeful tenderness, even if its structure is slightly wobbly." Sonia Saraiya of Variety described the finale film as "moving and beautiful", and Jon Frosch of The Hollywood Reporter called it "essential viewing".

In 2019, The Guardian ranked Looking amongst the "100 Greatest TV shows of the 21st century". In 2022, Esquire ranked Looking #21 on the list of "The Best HBO Series of All Time", stating, "The series never gained a massive audience, but its reverberations are still being felt."

Ratings
Looking was reported to have debuted to a "slow start" by Variety with a premiere audience of 338,000, although it went on to gain an audience of 606,000 when the encore's ratings were included. However, ratings improved as the season progressed. Ratings reached a series high in the sixth episode, attracting 519,000 viewers, up by 50% compared to the premiere episode. As of February 23, 2014, Looking had averaged 2million weekly viewers.

Accolades

Broadcast
Looking premiered on HBO Canada at the same time as the United States, with Australia's Showcase premiering the series on January 20, 2014. In New Zealand, SoHo premiered the series on January 23, 2014. Sky Atlantic in the United Kingdom and Ireland premiered it on January 27, 2014, opening to 0.067million viewers, with the highest rated episode attracting 0.129million for episode three. The second season premiered on February 5, 2015. The series premiered on May 6, 2014, on M-Net in South Africa.

References

External links

 
 

2010s American comedy-drama television series
2010s American LGBT-related comedy television series
2010s American LGBT-related drama television series
2014 American television series debuts
2015 American television series endings
Gay-related television shows
HBO original programming
Television shows filmed in California
Television shows set in San Francisco